Craig De Goldi (born 7 December 1975 in Greymouth) is a rugby union footballer from New Zealand. He won a gold medal as part of the New Zealand sevens rugby team at the 2002 Commonwealth Games.

De Goldi captained the All Blacks Sevens team at the 2002 Brisbane Sevens due to veteran captain Eric Rush sustaining a shoulder injury. He spent six years playing in Japan. In 2010 he played for the Manawatu sevens team.

References

1975 births
Living people
Commonwealth Games gold medallists for New Zealand
Commonwealth Games medallists in rugby sevens
Commonwealth Games rugby sevens players of New Zealand
New Zealand international rugby sevens players
New Zealand rugby union players
People educated at Waimea College
Rugby sevens players at the 2002 Commonwealth Games
Rugby union players from Greymouth
Medallists at the 2002 Commonwealth Games